Within These Walls is a 1945 American drama film directed by H. Bruce Humberstone and written by Eugene Ling and Coles Trapnell. The film stars Thomas Mitchell, Mary Anderson, Edward Ryan, Mark Stevens, B.S. Pully and Roy Roberts. The film was released on July 13, 1945, by 20th Century Fox.

Plot

When a judge, Michael Howland, decries conditions at a state prison, the governor recommends he become the new warden. Howland accepts, requiring that his family move to a new home near the penitentiary. His daughter Anne understands the situation, but teen son Tommy is upset by it.

While introducing a new no-tolerance discipline to the prisoners, Howland meets convicted embezzler Steve Purcell, whose good behavior while serving his sentence impresses the warden after a jailhouse incident. Howland needs a driver for his family and entrusts Purcell with the job.

Befriending a couple of inmates, Tommy assists them with a breakout. After a quarrel with his father, Tommy leaves for college and does not see his family again for nearly two years. One day new prisoners are brought in and among them is Tommy, found guilty of an armed robbery.

The warden does not bend the rules for his son. His daughter, meantime, has fallen in love with Purcell, finding out he was innocent of his crime, taking the rap for his guilty brother. Ruthless inmate Martin Deutsch learns this from Tommy and uses this information against Purcell, saying he will inform on the brother if Purcell doesn't help him escape.

Tommy's conscience gets the better of him. He knocks out Purcell to keep him from the prison break. Deutsch, trapped at the gate by the warden's guards, shoots Tommy in the back. Howland pursues the fleeing Deutsch and guns him down.

Cast   
Thomas Mitchell as Warden Michael Howland
Mary Anderson as Anne Howland
Edward Ryan as Tommie Howland
Mark Stevens as Steve Purcell
B.S. Pully as Harry Bowser
Roy Roberts as Martin 'Marty' Deutsch
John Russell as Rogers
Norman Lloyd as Peter Moran
Harry Shannon as Head Guard 'Mac' McCafferty
Edward Kelly as Convict Michael Callahan
Rex Williams as Hobey Jenkins
Ralph Dunn as Pearson
Dick Rush as Station agent
William Halligan as Collins 
Fred Graham as Guard
Joseph E. Bernard as Conductor 
Jack Daley as Conductor

References

External links 
 

1945 films
1945 drama films
1940s prison films
20th Century Fox films
American black-and-white films
American drama films
American prison films
Films directed by H. Bruce Humberstone
Films scored by David Buttolph
Films with screenplays by Wanda Tuchock
1940s English-language films
1940s American films